Commonwealth of the Bahamas Trade Union Congress is a central trade union federation in The Bahamas.

Leadership:
President: Obie Ferguson Jr.
General Secretary: Tyrone Morris

See also

 List of trade unions
 List of federations of trade unions

References

Trade unions in the Bahamas
Bahamas
1976 establishments in the Bahamas
Trade unions established in 1976